César Diop (born November 10, 1983 in Thiès) is a Senegalese footballer who plays for Carnoux FC in France, as a defensive midfielder.

Club career
Diop started his professional career in Senegal for ASC Police Dakar, where he played one professional season. he played for Amiens SC youth club. In July 2006, he moved to French fourth division team Gap FC. He spent two seasons at the club.

In the start of the 2008–09 season, he signed with French third level club SO Cassis Carnoux. He played 25 matches for SO Cassis Carnoux, but did not score a goal.

On 27 July 2009, Diop moved to Spain and signed with Gimnàstic de Tarragona, in the Segunda División. He was announced as one of eight signings for the 2009–10 season.

In his first season with the Catalans. His contract was not renewed at the end of the season and he being released from Nàstic.

After being released in July, Diop became a free agent and stay in this condition until January 2011, when he signed with new founded club Lorca Atlético CF. Six months later, he signed with CD Atlético Baleares.

References

External links
 
  
  
 
 
 
 
 
 

1983 births
Living people
Senegalese footballers
Association football midfielders
Gimnàstic de Tarragona footballers
CD Atlético Baleares footballers
Senegalese expatriate footballers
Expatriate footballers in France
Expatriate footballers in Spain
SO Cassis Carnoux players
Amiens SC players
Gap HAFC players
US Feurs players
Sportspeople from Thiès
Lorca Atlético CF players